Md Nazrul Islam Khan, also known as N I Khan, is a former education secretary of Bangladesh. He is currently the chairman and independent director of International Leasing and Financial Services Limited. He is also former PS-1 to Leader of the Opposition in the Parliament Sheikh Hasina and Prime Minister Sheikh Hasina at Prime Minister's Office.

Early life and education 
Khan was born on 1 December 1956 to Mrs. Ayesha Khan (died October 29, 2018) in Village: Mashwimnagar, Upazila: Monirampur  District Jessore. He attended local Maswimnagar Primary School before being admitted to Muslim Academy at Jessore District HQ. His father Insan Ali Khan is the eldest of four brothers and four sisters. Khan has a MSc in cytogenetics and BSc in botany from the University of Rajshahi and stood first Class first in both the examinations.

Career 
Khan was the director general of the Directorate of Primary Education in 2008.

In September 2011, Khan was appointed the secretary of the Ministry of Education. During his tenure he introduced online College admission; redesigned education institution Infrastracture well adapted in rainy environments and aerial aesthetics; elected Student Cabinet in Secondary Educational institutions. Before that, Khan was the secretary of the Information and Communication Technology Division at the Ministry of Posts, Telecommunications and Information Technology. He was also the Private Secretary to Prime Minister Sheikh Hasina and National Project Director of the Access to information in Bangladesh program of the Prime Minister's Office.

Khan was appointed the curator of Bangabandhu Memorial Museum in March 2016.

Khan is the chairman of National Wages and Productivity Commission; he was appoint chairman in 2016.

In November 2020, Khan was appointed the acting chairperson of Palli Sanchay Bank.

Khan was appointed the chairman of International Leasing and Financial Services Limited by Company Bench of High Court. In January 2021, another Bench of High Court Division issued an order banning his travel abroad following a petition filled by individuals who accused him of being involved with Prashanta Kumar Halder. The pettitioners had been defrauded by People’s Leasing and Financial Services and Prashanta Kumar Halder. The petitioner included Nashid Kamal, daughter of the former Chief Justice of Bangladesh Mustafa Kamal. The Appellate Division of the Bangladesh Supreme Court halted the order since he was never connected with peoples leasing and appointed as chairman of international leasing by Company Bench of High Court.

References

1956 births
Living people
People from Jessore District
Bangladeshi bankers
Bangladeshi civil servants